The Regional Plan Association is an independent, not-for-profit regional planning organization, founded in 1922, that focuses on recommendations to improve the quality of life and economic competitiveness of a 31-county New York–New Jersey–Connecticut region in the New York metropolitan area. Headquartered in New York City, it has offices in Princeton, New Jersey, and Stamford, Connecticut.

Regional plans 

RPA has produced four strategic regional plans for the New York metropolitan region since the 1920s. The chronology of their plans is as follows:
 The First Plan in 1929, developed under the leadership of Thomas Adams, provided a guide for the area's road and transportation network.
 The Second Plan, published as a series of reports in the 1960s, aimed at restructuring mass transit and reinvigorating deteriorating urban centers.
 The Third Plan in 1996, "A Region at Risk," recommended improving regional mass transit, increasing protection of open space and maintaining employment in traditional urban centers.
 The Fourth Plan in 2017 suggested improving the area's transportation network, making more affordable housing, implementing measures to fight climate change, and restructure the area's public institutions.

Planning philosophy 

The RPA program represents a philosophy of planning described by historian Robert Fishman as "metropolitanism," associated with the Chicago School of Sociology. It promotes large scale, industrial centers and the concentration of population rather than decentralized development. Its critics point out that this results in windfall real estate profits for downtown interests. Whether this approach to regional planning is efficient, particularly because of the infrastructure and energy required to sustain such concentration, has been questioned by scholars including James Howard Kunstler.

Impact in the Tri-state area 
Regional Plan Association's strategic plans have proposed numerous ideas and investments for the New York metropolitan area that have turned into major public works, economic development and open space projects, including:
  The location of the George Washington Bridge.
  The preservation of the Palisades and the construction of the Palisades Interstate Parkway.
 The redevelopment of Governors Island, through the RPA-led coalition Governors Island Alliance.
 The establishment of urban national parks like the Gateway National Recreation Area in Jamaica Bay.
 The revitalization of the regional centers like Downtown Brooklyn, Newark, and Stamford.

See also 

 Metropolitan planning organizations of New Jersey
 New York Metropolitan Transportation Council
 Port Authority of New York and New Jersey
 Megaregions of the United States

References 
Notes

Bibliography

Further reading

External links 

Guide to the Regional Plan Association Records, 1919–1997

1922 establishments in the United States
Civic and political organizations of the United States
Organizations based in New York City
Transportation in New York City
Urban planning in the United States
Urban planning organizations
Transportation planning
Organizations established in 1922
Russell Sage Foundation